Balmoor is a Mandal in Nagarkurnool district, Telangana, India.

Institutions
 Zilla Parishad High School.
 Upper Primary School.
 KGBV School.
 There is a post office.
 Tahashildar office.
 MPDO office.
 Police station.
 PHC.
 ICDS Office.
 Union Bank of India.
 BC Girls Hostel.
 SC Boys Hostel.
 ST Girls Hostel.
 Pragathi Vidya Niketan.

Villages
The villages in Balmoor mandal include:
 Ananthavaram 	
 Ambhagiri
 Balmoor 	
 Banala 	
 Chennaram 
 Ramagiri Chenchugudem	
 Gattuthummen 	
 Godal 
 GudiBanda
 Ippakunta	
 Jinkunta 	
 Jillellapally
 Kondanagula
 Kondareddypally 
 Kothapally	
 Laxmipally 	
 Mangalkunta pally
 Mahedevpur
 Narsai pally
 Polisettypally 	
 Polepally
 Ramajipally 
 ThodellaGadda	
 Thummanpet
 Billakal
 Mylaram
 Seetharamapuram
 Ram Nagar Colony
 VeeramRaju palle

References

Mandals in Nagarkurnool district